Yordanov Island is the 600 m long in west–east direction and 300 m wide rocky island with surface area of  whose north extremity Foul Point forms the east entrance to Ommanney Bay on the north coast of Coronation Island in the South Orkney Islands, Antarctica. It is separated from the main island by a passage narrowing to just 30 m at points. The island is named after Captain Yordan Yordanov, commander of the ocean fishing trawler Sagita of the Bulgarian company Ocean Fisheries – Burgas during its fishing trip to Antarctic waters off South Georgia from December 1979 to June 1980. A designated onboard team of marine biologists undertook fisheries research in the process. The Bulgarian fishermen, along with those of the Soviet Union, Poland and East Germany are the pioneers of modern Antarctic fishing industry.

Location
British mapping in 1963.

Maps
 British Antarctic Territory: South Orkney Islands. Scale 1:100000 topographic map. DOS Series 510. Surrey, England: Directorate of Overseas Surveys, 1963
 Antarctic Digital Database (ADD). Scale 1:250000 topographic map of Antarctica. Scientific Committee on Antarctic Research (SCAR). Since 1993, regularly upgraded and updated

Notes

References
 Yordanov Island. SCAR Composite Gazetteer of Antarctica

External links
 Yordanov Island. Copernix satellite image

 

Islands of the South Orkney Islands
Ocean Fisheries – Burgas Co
Bulgaria and the Antarctic